Sir Alexander Home of Renton, 1st Baronet (died 28 May 1698) was created a Baronet of Nova Scotia about 1678. He was also knighted sometime before 28 August 1671 when he was described as such in a Laing charter.

The "eldest lawful son" of Sir John Home, of Renton, Lord Renton, by his spouse Margaret, daughter of John Stewart, Commendator of Coldingham Priory, Sir Alexander married (contract dated 27 April 1678) Margaret, daughter of Sir William Scott, Lord Clerkington (d. 1656), a Senator of the College of Justice, by his second wife Barbara (d. 1684), daughter of Sir Alexander Dalmahoy of that Ilk, Knt.

His son and successor in the baronetcy was Sir Alexander Home, 2nd Baronet, of Renton (d. 17 February 1737 at Edinburgh and interred at Coldingham).

References
 Calendar of the Laing Charters, AD854 – 1837, edited by the Rev. John Anderson, Edinburgh, 1899, number 2722.
 Scott 1118 – 1923, by Keith S.M. Scott, F.S.A.,(Scot), London, 1923, p. 254.
 Index to Genealogies, Birthbriefs and Funeral Escutcheons, recorded in the Lyon Office, by Francis J. Grant, W.S., Rothesay Herald & Lyon Clerk and Keeper of the Records, Edinburgh, 1908, p. 28, for death date and parentage.

Home, Sir Alexander, 2nd Baronet
Scottish knights
Home, Sir Alexander, 2nd Baronet
Year of birth missing